Joseph Pitcairn (1764–1844) was an American diplomat, landowner and the American consul to the free Hansa city of Hamburg. The town of Pitcairn in New York State is named in his honour.

He married Lady Edward Fitzgerald, widow of the Irish Republican Lord Edward Fitzgerald in 1800.

They had a daughter Helen (Born Hamburg 27th April 1803 - Died London 17th April 1896)

References

Further reading
 Writings of John Quincy Adams (1913) The Macmillan company, New York 
 The quarterly publication of the Historical and Philosophical Society of Ohio, Volumes 10-12 (1917) 

American diplomats
1764 births
1844 deaths
American expatriates in Germany